Salt Lake is a natural lake in South Dakota, in the United States.

Salt Lake was named on account of its salty water.

See also
List of lakes in South Dakota

References

Lakes of South Dakota
Bodies of water of Brown County, South Dakota